Suzanne Paul  (born Susan Barnes in November 1956) is an English-born television personality and celebrity in New Zealand, who became famous for her Natural Glow product and roles as an infomercial hostess and television presenter.

Career
She grew up in the working class area of Whitmore Reans, Wolverhampton, and worked as a sales demonstrator for almost two decades in the United Kingdom. Paul came to New Zealand in 1991. Selling products such as Massage Pillow and the Suzanne Clip, Paul became a successful businesswoman and millionaire, and in 2006 won the Metro Magazine title of 'Woman with the most integrity'.

Paul had her own television series, Second Honeymoon, Garage Sale and Guess Who's Coming to Dinner, which screened on TVNZ, as well as appearing in many other top-rating New Zealand television programmes like City Celebrity Country Nobody, Celebrity Treasure Island, How's Life, Outrageous Fortune, Intrepid Journeys, Pulp Sport, Best Bits, What Now, Good Morning since then.

She relaunched herself through her trademark styled infomercials and in June 2007 (aged 50) won and became the oldest champion (in the world) of TVNZ's Dancing With The Stars. In September 2008 Paul published a memoir titled But Wait, There's More. In August 2009, Suzanne launched her own clothing range, Suzanne Paul Petites sizes 8 to 16, for women 5 ft 4 inch and under, and the Short & Sweet range in sizes 6 to 18. In September 2010, she announced plans to set up a fashion shop in Remuera to sell the range.

From July to August 2010 Suzanne had a starring role in the stage show, Stepping Out by Richard Harris. 

In 2011, Suzanne appeared in the stage show "Dirty Dusting".

In 2021, Suzanne appeared as a guest in episode 5 of the first season of RuPaul’s Drag Race Down Under.

Personal life
Paul has been married three times. Her first marriage was to Dean Kilworth, whom she met when she was 40. Their marriage failed in part due to the stress of unsuccessful IVF treatments. In 2005 she married Duncan Wilson. They divorced in 2016 due to Wilson's struggle with Asperger syndrome. In March 2020, she became engaged to drummer Patrick Kuhtze. He had also been married twice before. The wedding was planned for October 2021, but was postponed due to the COVID-19 pandemic. They finally got married on 30 October 2022.

See also
 List of New Zealand television personalities

References

External links

1956 births
Living people
New Zealand television presenters
New Zealand women television presenters
Place of birth missing (living people)
Dancing with the Stars (New Zealand TV series) winners
English emigrants to New Zealand
People from Wolverhampton